Mucho Mojo Is a mystery/crime novel by American author Joe R. Lansdale. This is the second in Lansdale's Hap and Leonard series of crime novels.

Plot summary
This story revolves around the death of Leonard Pine's Uncle Chester who happens to live next to a crack house. Under the floorboards of his uncle's house the two discover the skeleton of an infant wrapped in child pornography. Leonard refuses to believe his uncle could be involved so he enlists the help of his best friend, Hap Collins, to solve the murder and clear his uncle.

Editions
This book was published as a limited edition by Cemetery Dance Publications and as a trade hardcover by Mysterious Press in 1994. Both are now out of print. A trade paperback was published by Vintage Crime/Black Lizard on Jan. 6, 2009.

Awards
Mucho Mojo was listed as a New York Times Notable Book of the Year and was awarded British Fantasy Award.

References

External links
 Author's official Website
 Paperback Publisher's website
 

Novels by Joe R. Lansdale
American crime novels
1994 American novels
Novels set in Texas
Works by Joe R. Lansdale